The 1944 Colgate Red Raiders football team was an American football team that represented Colgate University as an independent during the 1944 college football season. In its 16th season under head coach Andrew Kerr, the team compiled a 2–5 record and was outscored by a total of 127 to 79. Edward Stacco and Joseph Dilts were the team captains. The team played its home games at Colgate Athletic Field in Hamilton, New York.

Schedule

References

Colgate
Colgate Raiders football seasons
Colgate Red Raiders football